Ulli Nissen (born 16 June 1959) is a German politician of the Social Democratic Party (SPD) who has been serving as a member of the Bundestag from the state of Hesse since 2013.

Political career 
Born in Essen, North Rhine-Westphalia, Nissen became member of the Bundestag in the 2013 German federal election, representing Frankfurt. She is a member of the Committee on Construction, Housing, Urban Development and Communities and the Committee on Environment, Nature Conservation and Nuclear Safety.

Other activities 
 1. FFC Frankfurt, Member
 German United Services Trade Union (ver.di), Member
 Pro Asyl, Member

References

External links 

  
 Bundestag biography 

1959 births
Living people
Members of the Bundestag for Hesse
Female members of the Bundestag
21st-century German women politicians
Members of the Bundestag 2017–2021
Members of the Bundestag 2013–2017
Members of the Bundestag for the Social Democratic Party of Germany